Tilbrook is a village and civil parish in Cambridgeshire, England. Tilbrook is situated within Huntingdonshire which is a non-metropolitan district of Cambridgeshire as well as being a historic county of England, although Tilbrook belongs historically to Bedfordshire.

Government
As a civil parish, Tilbrook has a parish council. The parish council is elected by the residents of the parish who have registered on the electoral roll; the parish council is the lowest tier of government in England. A parish council is responsible for providing and maintaining a variety of local services including allotments and a cemetery; grass cutting and tree planting within public open spaces such as a village green or playing fields. The parish council reviews all planning applications that might affect the parish and makes recommendations to Huntingdonshire District Council, which is the local planning authority for the parish. The parish council also represents the views of the parish on issues such as local transport, policing and the environment. The parish council raises its own tax to pay for these services, known as the parish precept, which is collected as part of the Council Tax.

Tilbrook was in Bedfordshire until 30 September 1896, when it was transferred to Huntingdonshire. From 1965, the village was part of the new administrative county of Huntingdon and Peterborough. Then in 1974, following the Local Government Act 1972, Tilbrook became a part of the county of Cambridgeshire.

The second tier of local government is Huntingdonshire District Council which is a non-metropolitan district of Cambridgeshire and has its headquarters in Huntingdon. Huntingdonshire District Council has 52 councillors representing 29 district wards. Huntingdonshire District Council collects the council tax, and provides services such as building regulations, local planning, environmental health, leisure and tourism. Tilbrook is a part of the district ward of Kimbolton and Staughton and is represented on the district council by one councillor. District councillors serve for four-year terms following elections to Huntingdonshire District Council.

For Tilbrook the highest tier of local government is Cambridgeshire County Council which has administration buildings in Cambridge. The county council provides county-wide services such as major road infrastructure, fire and rescue, education, social services, libraries and heritage services. Cambridgeshire County Council consists of 69 councillors representing 60 electoral divisions. Tilbrook is part of the electoral division of Brampton and Kimbolton and is represented on the county council by one councillor.

At Westminster Tilbrook is in the parliamentary constituency of Huntingdon, and elects one Member of Parliament (MP) by the first past the post system of election. Tilbrook is represented in the House of Commons by Jonathan Djanogly (Conservative). Jonathan Djanogly has represented the constituency since 2001. The previous member of parliament was John Major (Conservative) who represented the constituency between 1983 and 2001.

Demography

Population
In the period 1801 to 1901 the population of Tilbrook was recorded every ten years by the UK census.  During this time the population was in the range of 219 (the lowest was in 1801) and 392 (the highest was in 1881).

From 1901, a census was taken every ten years with the exception of 1941 (due to the Second World War). The population at the 2011 census included Covington and was recorded as being 370.

All population census figures from report Historic Census figures Cambridgeshire to 2011 by Cambridgeshire Insight.

References

External links

Entry in the Domesday Book
the Tilbrook motorcycle

Villages in Cambridgeshire
Huntingdonshire
Civil parishes in Cambridgeshire